903 Park Avenue is a 17-story residential building on Park Avenue on the Upper East Side of Manhattan, New York City.

Location
The building is located on the corner of 903 Park Avenue (where the main entrance is) and East 79th Street.

History
The building was erected from 1912 to 1914 by the construction firm Bing & Bing. It was designed by architect Robert T. Lyons. At the time of its construction, 903 Park Ave was said to be the tallest residential building in New York City.

It was acquired by Maria DeWitt Jesup, the widow of banker Morris Ketchum Jesup, in 1914. Physician and railroad investor William Seward Webb was an early tenant. In 1916, the widow and son of financial investor Norman B. Ream were also tenants.

In 1917, the building was acquired by Vincent Astor. By the 1930s, Walter Hoving was a tenant.

In 2002, the building was owned by Stahl Real Estate.

Architectural significance
As part of the Park Avenue Historic District, it has been listed on the National Register of Historic Places since August 29, 2010.

References

Park Avenue
Upper East Side
Residential buildings completed in 1914
Residential buildings on the National Register of Historic Places in Manhattan
Historic district contributing properties in Manhattan
Residential buildings in Manhattan